Xenoa is a 2007 sci-fi action-fantasy Filipino film, directed by Sean Lim. The film was released to Philippine theaters on August 22, 2007. It stars Isabel Granada, Paolo Ballesteros and Rafael Nanquil. The film gives a glimpse of the power struggle for the planet Xenoa. When the ruler of the triple-star system, Queen La’ian (Clem Poblete) gives birth to the heirs of the Xenoan throne, she decides to protect them from the scheming General Norak (Ronnie Martinez) by sending the triplets – Eli, Zeus and Drix (played by Granada, Ballesteros and Nanquil respectively) – to faraway Earth.

The film was released under the tagline "Three siblings. Two worlds. One empire."

Plot
The ruler of Xenoa, Queen La'ian, gives birth to the heirs of her throne: Eli, Zeus, and Drix. She decides to protect her triplets from the scheming leader of rival world Zephyr, General Norak, by sending her children to faraway Earth. Two decades later, the lives of the three estranged siblings intersect in the most unexpected way. Everything they know and love is suddenly threatened when General Norak zeroes in on them from light years away. The spiteful alien wants unconditional, uncontested power over Xenoa, but he is unable to achieve this as long as the true heirs to the throne are still alive. He is so hellbent on ruling Xenoa that he does not think twice about turning sibling against sibling in his quest for power.

Cast
 Isabel Granada as Eli
 Paolo Ballesteros as Zeus
 Rafael Nanquil as Drix
 Geryk Genasky Aguas as Dennis
 Clementine Poblete as La'ian / Lilia
 Ronnie Felipe Martinez as Norak
 Lesley Leveriza as Amanda
 Marq Dollentes as Alien actor
 Richard Turner as Bartender
 Sophia Castañeda as Bar customer
 Michael Poblete as Chevrolet driver
 Apollo Abraham as Drix's foster father
 Hiyasmin Neri as Jane
 Katsuji Kikuchi as John Yan
 Monette Rosello as Land lady
 Alan Marasigan as Mr. Legazpi
 Lily Chu as Martha
 Daniel Magisa as Mayor Villaruel
 P.J. Lanot as Mike

Production

Development
Sean Lim, director and writer of the film, admitted that Xenoa is his first film, although he has co-directed a Big Foot production shot in Hong Kong. He tells that the film is about hybrid human beings from another planet called "Xenoa". Lim admits to having a longtime crush on Isabel Granada. According to him, he specifically cast Isabel for the role because of her almond-shaped eyes, making her perfect for the role of a hybrid human named Eli. Her character is described as a naïve yet undeniably gorgeous woman. She is trusting and generous to a fault. Eli grows up in an orphanage house managed by nuns. Granada was supposed to play as the Queen. When director Lim saw her, he re-cast her as one of the triplets since she was too young to play the queen. Xenoa is considered to be Granada's comeback film, since her last movie was still in 2001 which was Halik ng Sirena.

Release
Xenoa’s world premiere happened on August 14, 2007, at 7 p.m. at SM Megamall Cinema 1, Ortigas Center. Regular showing dates were from August 22 up to 28, 2007 at all SM Cinemas nationwide.

Soundtrack

"Collide" is the official soundtrack single for Xenoa. It was the only song used for the promotion of the film. The song was performed and recorded by Filipino singer Nina. In October 2007, the song was included on her re-issued album Nina Featuring the Hits of Barry Manilow. It was also nominated for Best Song Written for Movie/TV/Stage Play on the 2008 Awit Awards.

On October 22, 2007, the song was made available on digital download through iTunes.

Music video

The music video for "Collide" was also directed by the film's director, Sean Lim. The video starts with Nina, shown lying on a beatle car. She is then seen singing to the song in close-up, with black background and night lights. Later, she is seen in a bedroom terrace and scenes from the movie start to appear. The scene goes back to the beatle car, where a bright light suddenly struck her face. By the last chorus, Nina is seen wearing a black gown, while floating in the air (with the use of special effects).

References

External links

2000 films
2000 action films
Philippine independent films
Philippine science fiction action films
Philippine science fantasy films
2000s Tagalog-language films